Tom Bowman (born 13 May 1976 in Molong, New South Wales, Australia), is an Australian Rugby Union Player who plays lock (2nd row).  He has so far won 16 caps for Australia, making his debut in the 76-0 thrashing England in June 1998.  The last test he played for Australia was the World Cup pool match against the U.S. in 1999.

External links 
http://www.sporting-heroes.net/rugby-heroes/displayhero.asp?HeroID=2223.

Living people
1976 births
Australian rugby union players
Australia international rugby union players
People educated at Scots College (Sydney)
Munster Rugby players
Rugby union locks
Rugby union players from New South Wales